Gabriele Puccio (born 3 August 1989) is an Italian footballer who plays as a defender or midfielder for S.C. Caronnese A.S.D.

Career

FC Internazionale
Puccio worked his way up from Inter's Pulcini A (Under-11) team and has since worked his way up. Gabriele plays as a central defender or defensive midfielder for the successful Primavera team.

He made his debut in the 2007–08 UEFA Champions League against PSV Eindhoven on 12 December 2007.  He also played the first leg of Coppa Italia against Reggina.

Lega Pro Prima Divisione
He spent the 2008–09 season on loan to Lega Pro Prima Divisione's Verona.

In summer 2009 he left for Portogruaro in co-ownership deal, for €5,000.

In 2011, he was signed by Pavia for €500. In January 2012 Puccio left for Savanoa of the fourth division but an injury made his vacation came early. In June 2012 Inter gave up the remain 50% registration rights. On 31 August 2012 he was signed by another fourth division side Monza. While former Inter teammate Maximiliano Uggè moved from Monza to Pavia.

On 27 July 2013 he was signed by Serie A club Parma as a free agent on a 2-year contract; on the same day he was farmed to the third division club Savona along with Alberto Galuppo and Alberto Giuliatto. on 31 January 2014 he was signed by Pergolettese.

On 8 July 2014 he was signed by Vigor Lamezia in a temporary deal.

References

External links
aic.football.it 
archivio.inter.it

1989 births
Living people
Italian footballers
Serie C players
Inter Milan players
Hellas Verona F.C. players
A.S.D. Portogruaro players
F.C. Pavia players
A.C. Monza players
Parma Calcio 1913 players
Mantova 1911 players
Rimini F.C. 1912 players
Association football defenders
Footballers from Milan
Association football utility players
S.C. Caronnese S.S.D. players